Chief O'Hara or Chief Ohara may refer to several fictional characters, all of which are chiefs of police:

Chief O'Hara (Disney Comics), a character in Mickey Mouse stories.
In Batman stories, it may refer to:
Chief Miles O'Hara, who appeared in the 1966-1968 Batman television series.
Chief Clancy O'Hara, the first victim of the Hangman killer in the Batman: Dark Victory comic book series.
Chief Daijiro Ohara, a character in the manga KochiKame: Tokyo Beat Cops.